Tha Miliso Me T' Asteria (Greek: Θα Μιλήσω Με Τ' Αστέρια; English: I'll Talk With Stars) is the third album by Greek singer Natasa Theodoridou. It was released on 17 March 2000 by Sony Music Greece and received platinum certification in Greece, selling 50,000 units. The tracks were written by several artists and frequent partners of Theodoridou, including Triantaphillos, Natalia Germanou, and Eleni Giannatsoulia. It contained five singles, including "Na Grapseis Lathos", "An Iparhei Paradeisos", "Diplo Paihnidi" and "Proti Fora Tha Kano Kati Sosto".

Track listing

Credits 
Credits adapted from the album's liner notes.

Personnel 
Hakan Bingolou: säz (tracks: 2)
Giannis Bithikotsis: baglama (tracks: 3, 6, 12, 13) || bouzouki (tracks: 3, 6, 8, 12, 13, 15) || cura (tracks: 2, 7, 8, 13, 14, 15)
Stavros Pazarentsis: clarinet (tracks: 7) || zurna (tracks: 4)
Akis Diximos: second vocal (tracks: 2, 6, 8, 12, 13, 15)
Nikos Georgountzos: keyboards (tracks: 1, 2, 3, 5, 6, 8, 9, 10, 11, 12, 13, 14, 15)
Stelios Goulielmos: backing vocals (tracks: 1, 4, 7, 9, 10, 11, 13, 14)
Antonis Gounaris: cümbüş (tracks: 4) || guitar (tracks: 1, 2, 3, 4, 5, 6, 7, 8, 9, 10, 11, 12, 14, 15) || orchestration, programming (tracks: 1, 2, 3, 5, 6, 8, 9, 10, 11, 12, 13, 14, 15)
Anna Ioannidou: backing vocals (tracks: 1, 4, 7, 9, 10, 11, 13, 14)
Katerina Kiriakou: backing vocals (tracks: 1, 4, 7, 9, 10, 11, 13, 14)
Giorgos Kostoglou: bass (tracks: 3, 9, 12)
Antonis Koulouris: drums (tracks: 3, 6, 9, 12)
Fedon Lionoudakis: accordion (tracks: 8)
Andreas Mouzakis: drums (tracks: 1, 4, 7)
Konstantinos Pantzis: orchestration, programming (tracks: 4, 7)
Giorgos Roilos: percussion (tracks: 4, 7)
Nikos Sakellarakis: trumpet (tracks: 1)
Filippos Tseberoulis: saxophone (tracks: 1, 5)
Nikos Vardis: bass (tracks: 4, 7)

Production 
Takis Argiriou (Argiriou Recordings studio): mix engineer, sound engineer (tracks: 1, 2, 3, 5, 6, 8, 9, 10, 11, 12, 13, 14, 15)
Vasilis Bouloubasis: hair styling
Doukas Chatzidoukas: styling
Thodoris Chrisanthopoulos (Fabelsound): mastering
Giannis Doulamis: executive producer
Iakovos Kalaitzakis: make up
Lefteris Neromiliotis (Sofita studio): mix engineer, sound engineer (tracks: 4, 7)
Dimitris Rekouniotis: artwork
Katerina Sideridou: art direction
Konstantinos Tsiliakos: photographer

References

Natasa Theodoridou albums
Greek-language albums
2000 albums
Sony Music Greece albums